The Nobar Bathhouse is one of the historical Public bathing in Tabriz, Iran. It was constructed in the centre of the city near the Nobar gate, one of the old gates of Tabriz. Nobar bath, which covers an area about 700 sq. metres, was used as a public bath until 1994. Its ruins have been restored by Cultural Heritage Organization of East Azarbaijan Province and registered as part of Iran's National Heritage.

Architectural plan
Like the other baths in Iran, Nobar bath has a narrow passage, Sar-beena (where people dressed and undressed), heating centre, water pool and Garm-Khaneh (washing part) which ornamented with brick and tile works. Moreover, there were some private bath rooms called Shah-neshin for royal families.

Restoration

The restoration of Nobar bath has lasted for 6 years. After restoration it equipped and turned to traditional restaurant divided to tree parts and tea house. In the upstairs Kebabs and other local foods and sweets are served.

See also 
 Turkish bath
 Public bathing
 Tarbiyat street
 Nobar

References 
  Editorial Board, East Azarbaijan Geography, Iranian Ministry of Education, 2000 * https://web.archive.org/web/20120226205859/http://www.eachto.ir/

Buildings and structures in Tabriz
Architecture in Iran
Tourist attractions in Tabriz
Public baths in Iran